The Ibanez Iceman is a guitar produced by Hoshino Gakki under Ibanez brand.

Background
Hoshino Gakki exported copies of American electric and acoustic guitars in the 1950s, and by the mid-1970s the Ibanez guitars had reached a level of quality comparable to American guitars. Lower labor rates at the time, plus efficient manufacturing meant that Ibanez guitars could be sold for almost half (or less) of the cost of a Gibson Les Paul or Fender Stratocaster.

In the mid-1970s Hoshino Gakki wanted to make a distinctly Japanese guitar and to start breaking away from the Ibanez replicas of Fender and Gibson models. The idea was to build a guitar with an appealing original design, like a Les Paul or Stratocaster. A meeting between Hoshino (Ibanez), Kanda Shokai (Greco) and one of the main guitar factories in Japan (FujiGen) resulted in the Iceman/Mirage design. Each distribution company had distribution rights to it in different global markets. Hoshino Gakki (Ibanez) had the rights outside of Japan and Kanda Shokai (Greco) had the rights for Japan.

The early Ibanez models were originally named the Artist 2663 models, launched in 1975. The name "Iceman" came later in 1978. The Greco model was named the Mirage and they are basically the same except for the pickup types that were used. Super 2000, Triple Coil and V2 pickups were used for the Ibanez Iceman, depending on the model number. Greco Dry and DiMarzio Super II pickups were used for the Greco Mirage. Body wood, pickups and neck joint construction varied with the Iceman/Mirage model price. The original Ibanez Artist/Iceman production was from 1975 to 1982/1983 with different models having set neck and bolt-on necks.

The Ibanez Iceman II that was released in 1982/1983 had a different headstock with 6 in line tuners instead of the 3 a side tuners the original Ibanez Iceman had.

Use and signature models by Paul Stanley
Paul Stanley of KISS favored the Iceman from 1977 to 1980 and again used it primarily from 1992 to 1997 until he started endorsing his own model by Washburn guitars, but in 2016 he returned to Ibanez

Probably the most sought after by collectors is the PS-10, or Paul Stanley model. This came out in 1977 as the popularity of the rock band KISS skyrocketed. Ibanez approached Paul while KISS was on tour in Japan in March, 1977. They offered him a chance to develop his own signature model. He liked the shape of the Artist 2663 model and made changes to that model as his ideas came to fruition in the PS10 model. The PS10 first appeared in the 1978 Ibanez catalog, although it may have been available for purchase prior to catalog printing. Paul Stanley (rhythm guitar, vocals) played an Iceman for the next 4 years. A live shot of him with the Iceman appears inside the album cover of KISS ALIVE II. This model retailed for about $695 in 1978, and was offered through 1981.

In 1995 the PS-10 was re-issued as the Korean-made PS10II. A deluxe version, the PS10LTD (or Limited) was also introduced in 1995. The PS10LTD was made in Japan and had gold hardware (which Stanley is said to have not liked) as well as an ebony fretboard and different pickups than the PS10II. Sales must have been good because in 1997 yet another PS was offered in the catalog - this was sold as the PS10-CL (or Classic). The biggest difference between them is that the PS10-II was made in Korean factories and the LTD and Classic were Japanese made and also had all the same features of the original 1978 model (like the Gibraltar bridge and Quick Change tailpiece). Although the catalog shows the PS10-II with "Paul Stanley" inlaid at the 21 fret, most were not produced this way. Apparently there was a problem with the inserts at the Korean factory and it was decided not to use them.

Paul Stanley states;

"First of all, the Iceman and the PS10 have about as much in common as a Chevy and a Rolls-Royce. The PS10 came about in the '70s, when we were on our first trip to Japan. Ibanez was interested in me doing a signature guitar with them. They wanted to me to design something new, and we did go through their catalog, I saw a picture of a guitar that was not terribly popular. I liked the asymmetrical shape to it; it reminded me of a Firebird or a Rickenbacker bass turned upside down. It had one pickup on it that looked like you took three bobbins from a humbucker and put them together somehow. It also had that wacky knob that looked like you were to change your television channels with it! I said, "You've got something here, but you don't know what to do with it." My feeling about Ibanez in the '70s, like many companies in Japan, was that they were excellent at copying but they didn't know why they were copying. We sat down, and by using that basic shape, I came up with a guitar: construction, frets, inlays, wiring, the type of tail block that has a sustain block built into it, the half-brass/half-bone nut, and so on. In other words, we took a shape and made a new guitar. Although there is still a guitar called an Iceman and some people use the name interchangeably with the PS10, they really have nothing in common except a silhouette".

Variations

Ibanez ICJ100WZ 

The Ibanez ICJ100WZ was an Iceman-shaped signature guitar for Jay Yuenger of White Zombie, introduced in 1996. It featured a mahogany body with maple top, painted in green with white stars all over the place, a set-in maple neck with bound ebony fingerboard. Hardware equipped on it was Lo Pro Edge tremolo, two humbucking pickups, 3 knob control and 3 way toggle with coil split.

Ibanez DMM1

Daron Malakian of System of a Down favored the IC300 from the early days of System of a Down up to the Mezmerize/Hypnotize era (2004-2005), when he switched to using Gibson SGs, although he has been recently seen playing Iceman guitars again with System, making use of a custom-made model which is currently his main guitar. Daron had his own signature model, the Ibanez DMM1, released in 2004. It was a limited edition run based on the Ibanez Iceman ICX shape and features a special graphic design painted by Daron’s father, Vartan Malakian. Only 300 were made.

Ibanez STM 

The STM is a special version of Iceman designed for Sam Totman of DragonForce, released from 2008 to 2010. Essentially it is an Iceman with a 24-fret neck-through neck and Edge III tremolo instead of a hardtail bridge. This is the first production Iceman since the 1990s to have a whammy bar.

Ibanez Fireman 

In 2009, the Iceman was remodeled by Paul Gilbert using Photoshop, by flipping the body of the Iceman over. Since the cutout was on the other side, they added another cutout that was a bit smaller than the trademark Iceman stalk. There were two designs; both of a natural wood finish, one with mahogany with a cherry fret-board and another with korina wood.

Paul Gilbert's model was released at a 2009 Guitar show as the "Ibanez Fireman", with a set 3-piece korina/bubinga neck, 22 frets, and a 24-3/4" scale length. It also contained a fixed Gibraltar II bridge, (with a Quick Charge tailpeice) and Dimarzio Area 67 hum-cancelling single coil pickups. It comes with a hard Ibanez case, (authenticated by Paul Gilbert) and additional accessories, limited edition. Paul Gilbert also notes in interviews that a fan submitted the idea for the name:

"At first, I called it the 'Reverse Iceman', but a fan wrote to me and suggested the 'Ibanez Fireman', and since fire is the opposite of ice, that’s what we ended up calling it."

Ibanez FTM33 Stoneman

This 8-string signature model for Meshuggah guitarist Fredrik Thordendal is essentially a hybrid design blending the Iceman body shape with a reverse Gibson Firebird, featuring an ash wing body, 7-piece maple/walnut neck-through construction with KTS™ TITANIUM reinforcement rods, 27" scale length, jatoba fretboard (as of 2018), 24 jumbo frets, FX Edge III-8 locking fixed bridge and a pair of Lundgren M8P ceramic humbucking pickups. Introduced in 2017, this guitar is available in Weathered Black.

Other notable users
Steve Miller recorded his Fly like an Eagle album as well as parts of the Book of Dreams record with his Ibanez Iceman IC210.

Jay Yuenger of White Zombie played several Iceman guitars for years and had a signature model, the ICJ100WZ.

Ginger of The Wildhearts was an Iceman player for several years, until he gifted the instrument to Cardiacs leader Tim Smith, who used it for the remainder of the band's active career.

Mitch Mitchell of Guided by Voices used an Iceman for the group's "Classic Lineup" reunion tours.

Chris Catalyst has routinely played an Iceman onstage since joining The Sisters of Mercy.

Nash Kato of Urge Overkill has frequently played an Iceman since the inception of the group. Since Urge Overkill's reunion in 2004, Kato has played a special gold-finished model with a "UO" insignia on the guitar's pickguard.

Doyle Wolfgang von Frankenstein, formerly used an Ibanez Iceman in the early days of the Misfits before building his custom made guitar.

Tom Petty used an Iceman.

Pig Champion of Poison Idea used a modified Iceman for most of the bands existence.

Daron Malakian, of System of a Down used an Iceman their early albums up through Steal This Album! before switching to a Gibson SG. He has switched back to an Iceman in 2014.

Sam Totman of DragonForce has his own signature Iceman model, most notably in a light blue sparkle finish.

Thomas Gabriel Fischer of Celtic Frost and Triptykon uses Ibanez Icemans almost exclusively, most notably his own signature models customized with images done by artist H.R. Giger being used as the finishes.

Paul Stanley of Kiss uses Ibanez Icemans and also has his own signature edition with a cracked mirror finish, he also sells stage-played Icemans after his shows

Bob Mothersbaugh of DEVO used a blue Ibanez Iceman

Specifications
(From Ibanez catalog)

Serial numbers
The serial number format is MYYPPPP.
M = production month (A=January B=February ... K=November L=December).
YY = year (79=1979).
PPPP = production number.
FujiGen Gakki used this format for the Ibanez guitars they made from the mid-1970s to 1987.

See also
 List of Ibanez players

Footnotes

References 
 Ibanez, The Untold Story by Paul Specht (Michael Wright, Jim Donahue) 
 Ibanez Catalogues

Iceman